The 1990–91 Liga Artzit season saw Maccabi Petah Tikva win the title and earn promotion to Liga Leumit alongside runners-up Maccabi Yavne. At the other end of the table Maccabi Ramat Amidar and Hapoel Tirat HaCarmel were relegated to Liga Alef, whilst Hapoel Bat Yam were relegated after losing the promotion-relegation play-offs.

Final table

Promotion-relegation play-offs
Fourteenth-placed Hapoel Bat Yam had to play-off against Liga Alef play-off winners Hakoah Ramat Gan:

The result meant that Hapoel Bat Yam were relegated.

References
Previous seasons The Israel Football Association 

Liga Artzit seasons
Israel
2